Takatada Ihara (6 June 1929 – 14 September 2014) was a Japanese television director and producer. Ihara died from heart disease.

References

2014 deaths
1929 births
Japanese film directors
Place of birth missing